Wayne Cooney (born 23 March 1968) is a former footballer who played in the League of Ireland during the 1990s.

Career
Born in Birmingham, Cooney started his career at Norwich City before returning to Dublin to sign for Noel King's Shamrock Rovers side in 1988. He made his debut on 4 September  and became a popular figure with the fans in his 4 years at Rovers. He made a total of 127 appearances scoring 6 times for the Hoops.

He then moved to Dundalk. After a couple of seasons at Oriel Park, he became Turlough O'Connor's first signing for Bohemians where he scored his debut for Bohs on 3 January 1994 in a 2-0 league win over Cobh Ramblers. He made 4 appearances in European competition for Bohs, all of them in the 1995 Intertoto Cup.

Cooney earned caps for the Republic of Ireland national under-19 team.

References

1968 births
Living people
Republic of Ireland association footballers
Republic of Ireland youth international footballers
Association football fullbacks
Shamrock Rovers F.C. players
Bohemian F.C. players
Dundalk F.C. players
League of Ireland players
English footballers
English people of Irish descent
Footballers from Birmingham, West Midlands
Newry City F.C. players
NIFL Premiership players
Cliftonville F.C. players